John Raleigh (born John Austin Raleigh) was a Major League Baseball pitcher. He played two seasons with the St. Louis Cardinals after having been purchased by the team from the Vernon Tigers of the Pacific Coast League.

References

People from Elkhorn, Wisconsin
Baseball players from Wisconsin
St. Louis Cardinals players
Major League Baseball pitchers
Vernon Tigers players
1887 births
1955 deaths
Sportspeople from Escondido, California